Pantersbridge (Cornish: Pons Yesu, meaning Jesus Bridge)is a hamlet in the parish of St Neot, Cornwall, England, UK. It is about one mile south of Warleggan on the road from St Neot to Cardinham and on the River Warleggan. Early spellings of the name include Pontyesu in 1241 and Ponteisu, circa 1250, Pontewysy in 1359, becoming Pontwise Bridge, or Pontowise bridge by 1613.

References

Hamlets in Cornwall